Vale is an unincorporated community in Greenbrier County, West Virginia, United States.

The community was named for a vale near the original town site.

References

Unincorporated communities in Greenbrier County, West Virginia
Unincorporated communities in West Virginia